The 1999 Lamar Hunt U.S. Open Cup ran from June to October 1999, open to all soccer teams in the United States. It was the first Open Cup tournament to be named after Lamar Hunt. The Rochester Raging Rhinos of the A-League defeated the Colorado Rapids 2–0 in the final at Columbus Crew Stadium in Columbus, Ohio. The Rhinos became the first, and as of 2022, only non-Division I team to win the Open Cup since the inception of Major League Soccer, defeating four MLS teams in the tournament. Another A-League team, the Charleston Battery, also reached the semifinals, and the A-League's Staten Island Vipers were the other non-division one squad to beat an MLS team.

Bracket
Home teams listed on top of bracket

Schedule
Note: Scorelines use the standard U.S. convention of placing the home team on the right-hand side of box scores.

First round
Eight D3 Pro, four PDL, and four USASA teams start.

Second round
Eight A-League teams enter.

Third round
Eight MLS teams enter.

Quarterfinals

Semifinals

Final

Top scorers

See also
 United States Soccer Federation
 Lamar Hunt U.S. Open Cup
 Major League Soccer
 United Soccer Leagues
 USASA
 National Premier Soccer League

Cup
U.S. Open Cup
Rochester New York FC